Zoltán Berkes may refer to:

Zoltán Berkes (canoeist), Hungarian sprint canoer
Zoltán Berkes (field hockey) (1916–1996), Hungarian field hockey player